Massachusetts Newsstand is a product of ProQuest that provides online fulltext articles from a few selected newspapers published in Massachusetts between the 1980s and the present. It includes some current news coverage for parts of Berkshire, Middlesex, Suffolk, and Worcester counties. It does not include current news for the state's 10 other counties. As of 2012, the product bundle consists of content from:

See also
 List of newspapers in Massachusetts

References

Newspapers published in Massachusetts
ProQuest